David Wales may refer to:

David J. Wales (born 1963), Professor of Chemistry at the University of Cambridge
 David Art Wales (born 1964), Australian entrepreneur